Asian Highway 41 (AH41)  is a route of the Asian Highway Network, running  from Teknaf in Chittagong Division, Bangladesh to Mongla in Khulna Division, Bangladesh.

It passes only through Bangladesh to provide connectivity between Port of Chittagong and Port of Mongla – the two busiest sea ports of Bangladesh. It also shares some portions with the two longest routes of the Asian Highway Network – AH1 and AH2.

Bangladesh

 : Teknaf — Cox's Bazar — Chittagong — Feni — Comilla — Dhaka
 : Dhaka — Joydebpur
 : Joydebpur — Tangail — Elenga
 : Elenga — Hatikumrul
 : Hatikumrul — Bonpara
 : Bonpara — Dasuria
 : Dasuria — Kushtia — Jhenaidah
 : Jhenaidah — Jessore — Khulna — Mongla

References

Asian Highway Network
Highways in Bangladesh